The Wilkes-Barre Bullets were a professional football team in the American Association that played from 1948 to 1949.

In 1948, the Bullets went 1-9, finishing in last place in the six-team league. 

In 1949,  six games through the season, the League revoked the Bullets franchise and listed the four remaining games as forfeits.  Their official record for the season 3-7, finishing fifth.

References

American football teams established in 1948
Defunct American football teams in Pennsylvania
Sports in the Scranton–Wilkes-Barre metropolitan area
1948 establishments in Pennsylvania
1949 disestablishments in Pennsylvania
American football teams disestablished in 1949